Monica Faith Stewart (born September 3, 1952) is an American politician who served as a Democratic member of the Illinois House of Representatives from 1981 until 1983.

Stewart was born in Chicago, Illinois on September 3, 1952, and attended Chicago Public Schools. She graduated from Vassar College in Poughkeepsie, New York with a bachelor's degree in History. She later earned her master's degree from the John F. Kennedy School of Government. She was elected to the Illinois House of Representatives in the 1980 election.

In 1982, Stewart chose to challenge Democratic incumbent Gus Savage in Illinois's 2nd congressional district. She came in third of four candidates finishing behind incumbent Savage and CTA Chair Eugene Barnes. After her primary loss, Stewart chose to run for reelection in 1982 as an independent against fellow incumbent Democrat Howard B. Brookins Sr. after her failed congressional campaign. She lost the general election.

In the 1986 special election for the Chicago City Council, Stewart ran against Robert Kellam, a white incumbent, in an eight candidate race in Chicago's 18th ward. She was endorsed by the Chicago Tribune and by Mayor Harold Washington. Stewart, viewed as the most viable African-American opponent to Kellum, ultimately lost the election receiving 4,720 (24%) to Kellum's 12,666 votes (64%). In the 1990 Democratic primary, she challenged incumbent Mary Flowers, losing in a four-way race.

She served as an observer with the United Nations for the 1994 South African general election. After the election, she decided to move to South Africa and opened a restaurant in Johansberg. In 2000, Governor George Ryan appointed Stewart the managing director at Illinois Africa Trade and Investment Office in South Africa, one of the few U.S. state trade offices in Africa at the time. She served in that capacity for ten years. Governor Pat Quinn appointed Carol Adams who served as the head of the Illinois Department of Human Services.

She was involved in Democrats Abroad as a delegate for the 2008 presidential campaign of Barack Obama.

Notes

1952 births
Living people
Politicians from Chicago
Vassar College alumni
Harvard Kennedy School alumni
Women state legislators in Illinois
African-American state legislators in Illinois
Democratic Party members of the Illinois House of Representatives
20th-century American politicians
20th-century American women politicians
20th-century African-American women
20th-century African-American politicians
21st-century African-American people
21st-century African-American women